Élysée Montmartre is a music venue located at 72 Boulevard de Rochechouart, Paris, France. It opened in 1807, burned down in 2011, reopened in 2016, and has a capacity of 1,380 patrons. The nearest métro station is Anvers.

Origins 
The Élysée Montmartre was originally a ballroom inaugurated in 1807 where the famous Can-Can was performed among others dances during the 19th century.

In 1900, the venue was damaged by fire and re-decorated. After the Second World War, it started hosting boxing matches.

Notable productions
The piece The Mask by Maupassant takes place in the venue. Henri de Toulouse-Lautrec created several paintings here as well.

From the mid-1970s to mid-1980s, a wide variety of French and international performers gained notoriety at the location, including Patti Smith, Alain Souchon, and Jacques Higelin.

In 1992, Steel Pulse released their first live album, Rastafari Centennial - Live in Paris, which was recorded over three nights at the venue.

David Bowie's performance, during the Hours Tour, on 14 October 1999, was filmed and recorded, with three songs later appearing on the CD single of "Survive". A heavily edited recording was released to streaming services as a live album entitled "Something In The Air (Live Paris '99)" in 2020; and later in limited quantities on physical media on 12 March 2021.

American metal band Symphony X recorded their first live album, Live on the Edge of Forever, at the venue during a tour in 2000.

In 2005, Cradle of Filth recorded their live DVD, Peace Through Superior Firepower at the venue. The performance was filmed on 2 April 2005.

In 2007, Counting Crows re-released their debut album, August and Everything After, as a two-disc deluxe edition. The second disc is a recording of a performance at the theatre on 9 December 1994.

The venue is mentioned in The Roots' 1999 song, "You Got Me", as a place where the subject saw the band and narrator perform, even though they both lived in the same building in Philadelphia.

Recent history 

The room returned to its original vocation in 1995 with dancing evenings animated by the Grand Orchestre de L’Élysée Montmartre and it is now one of the most famous music venues in the city.

Finnish Metal band Sonata Arctica were the last band to perform at "Élysée" before it caught fire on 16 March 2011. On 22 March 2011 in the morning, the building caught fire.

The venue was purchased by Julien Labrousse and Abel Nahmias in 2013, it was rebuilt completely under the direction of Julien Labrousse, it reopened in September 2016  with a concert of Matthieu Chedid.

References

External links

Élysée Montmartre official site
Venue description

Music venues in Paris
Buildings and structures in the 18th arrondissement of Paris
1807 establishments in France
Montmartre
Music venues in France